Roosevelt High School may refer to:

Eleanor Roosevelt
 Eleanor Roosevelt High School (California), Eastvale, California
 Eleanor Roosevelt High School (Maryland)
 Eleanor Roosevelt High School (New York City)
Eleanor Roosevelt School, Warm Springs, Georgia

Franklin Delano Roosevelt
 Franklin Delano Roosevelt High School (Hyde Park, New York)
 Franklin Delano Roosevelt High School (New York City)
 Franklin D. Roosevelt High School (Texas), Dallas, Texas

Theodore Roosevelt
 Theodore Roosevelt College and Career Academy, Gary, Indiana; formerly known as Theodore Roosevelt High School
 Theodore Roosevelt High School (Fresno, California)
 Theodore Roosevelt High School (Los Angeles, California)
 Theodore Roosevelt High School (Colorado)
 President Theodore Roosevelt High School, Honolulu, Hawaii
 Theodore Roosevelt High School (Illinois), Chicago, Illinois
 Theodore Roosevelt High School (Iowa), Des Moines, Iowa
 Theodore Roosevelt High School (Michigan), Wyandotte, Michigan
 Theodore Roosevelt High School (Washington, D.C.)
 Roosevelt High School (Minnesota), Minneapolis, Minnesota
 Roosevelt High School (Missouri), St. Louis, Missouri
 Theodore Roosevelt High School (New York City)
 Theodore Roosevelt High School (Yonkers, New York)
 Roosevelt High School (Dayton, Ohio)
 Theodore Roosevelt High School (Kent, Ohio)
 Roosevelt High School (South Dakota), Sioux Falls, South Dakota
 Theodore Roosevelt High School (San Antonio, Texas), San Antonio, Texas
 Roosevelt High School (Washington), Seattle, Washington

Other
 Roosevelt Hall at Eastern Michigan University, formerly Roosevelt High School
 Roosevelt High School (Roosevelt, New York)
 Roosevelt High School (Oregon)
 Roosevelt High School (Lubbock, Texas)
 Roosevelt Middle School, Oakland, California, formerly Roosevelt High School
 Roosevelt High School (Wyoming)

See also
 Roosevelt Elementary School (disambiguation)
 Roosevelt Intermediate School
 Roosevelt Junior High School (disambiguation)
 Roosevelt Middle School (disambiguation)
 Roosevelt School (disambiguation)